Stirlingville can mean:
 Stirlingville, Alberta, a hamlet
 Stirlingville, Michigan, a hamlet